Megalobox is a 2018 Japanese anime series created in commemoration of the 50th anniversary of the manga Ashita no Joe. The series was announced on October 12, 2017 through a video uploaded to TMS Entertainment's official YouTube channel. It was produced by TMS Entertainment and 3xCube with Yō Moriyama as series director and concept designer. Katsuhiko Manabe and Kensaku Kojima were in charge of the scripts, with music composed by hip hop artist Mabanua. The series premiered on JNN, TBS, and BS-TBS from April 6 to June 29, 2018.

The series was simulcasted on Crunchyroll. During their Anime Expo 2018 panel, Viz Media announced that they licensed the anime. Anime Limited announced that they had acquired the series for home video release in the United Kingdom and Ireland. Madman Entertainment acquired the series for distribution in Australia and New Zealand, and streamed the series on AnimeLab.

The series premiered on Adult Swim's Toonami programming block on December 9, 2018.

During Anime NYC on November 16, 2019, the staff announced that the series would receive a second season. The second season, titled Megalobox 2: Nomad, aired from April 4 to June 27, 2021 on Tokyo MX and BS11. The main staff and cast members reprised their roles. Funimation licensed the second season.

Series overview

Episode list

Megalobox (2018)

Megalobox 2: Nomad (2021)

Home media release

Japanese

English

Notes

References

Megalo Box